Trout Creek may refer to

 Trout Creek, Alaska, a hospitality stop of the Yukon Quest sled dog race
 Trout Creek (Cannonsville Reservoir tributary), in New York
 Trout Creek (Deschutes River), in Oregon
 Trout Creek (Lake Tahoe), California, a tributary of Lake Tahoe
 Trout Creek (Los Gatos Creek tributary), California, a tributary of Los Gatos Creek
 Trout Creek (Truckee River tributary), California, a tributary of the Truckee River
 Trout Creek, Michigan, a community in Interior Township, Ontonagon County, Michigan, USA
 Trout Creek (Michigan), a tributary of the Ontonagon River
 Trout Creek, Montana, a census-designated place in the U.S. state of Montana
 Trout Creek (Monument Creek), a tributary of Monument Creek
 Trout Creek Pass, a mountain pass in the Rocky Mountains of the U.S. state of Colorado
 Trout Creek, Ontario, a community in the Canadian province of Ontario
 Trout Creek Mountains, Oregon/Nevada
 Trout Creek (Lake Erie), a watershed administered by the Long Point Region Conservation Authority, that drains into Lake Erie

See also
Trout Brook (disambiguation)
Trout Run (disambiguation)